T. J. Holyfield (born September 22, 1995) is an American professional basketball player for EWE Baskets Oldenburg of the Basketball Bundesliga. He played college basketball for Stephen F. Austin and Texas Tech.

Early life and high school career 
Holyfield attended Manzano High School in Albuquerque, New Mexico. He did a postgraduate year at Elev8 Sports Institute in Florida and signed with Stephen F. Austin.

College career 
Holyfield averaged 7.5 points, 4.2 rebounds, 1.1 assists and 1.5 blocks per game as a freshman. As a sophomore, he averaged 11.7 points and 7.2 rebounds per game. He was named to the Second Team All-Southland Conference. On November 18, 2017, he scored a career-high 25 points and had nine rebounds and five steals in a 118–64 win against Howard Payne University. Holyfield averaged 12.9 points and 6.4 rebounds per game as a junior while shooting 54.8 percent from the field. He was named to the Third Team All-Southland as well as the All-Defensive Team. Holyfield earned MVP honors of the 2018 Southland Conference men's basketball tournament. Holyfield helped the Lumberjacks reach the NCAA Tournament before losing to Texas Tech 70–60 in the first round with Holyfield contributing 10 points and four rebounds. He redshirted the 2018–19 season with a shoulder injury, and spent the season giving a speech at his church, wrapping Christmas presents for under-privileged children and visiting children in Belfast.

After the season, Holyfield decided to transfer to Texas Tech, choosing the Red Raiders over Kansas, Oregon, Illinois and Miami (Fla.). He had 15 points and six rebounds in the season-opening victory over Eastern Illinois, followed by 20 points and had six rebounds in a win over Bethune-Cookman. Holyfield was named Big 12 newcomer of the week on November 11, 2019. As a senior, Holyfield averaged 8.9 points, 4.5 rebounds and 1.1 assists per game.

Professional career 
On May 20, 2020, Holyfield signed with Kauhajoki Karhu of the Finnish Korisliiga.

On June 17, 2021, he has signed with EWE Baskets Oldenburg of the Basketball Bundesliga.

References

External links 
Texas Tech Red Raiders bio
Stephen F. Austin Lumberjacks bio
Twitter

1995 births
Living people
American expatriate basketball people in Finland
American men's basketball players
Basketball players from Albuquerque, New Mexico
EWE Baskets Oldenburg players
Power forwards (basketball)
Riesen Ludwigsburg players
Stephen F. Austin Lumberjacks basketball players
Texas Tech Red Raiders basketball players